is a  mountain of the Hokusetsu Mountains, located on the border of Inagawa, Hyōgo and Nose, Ōsaka, Japan. This mountain is one of Osaka 50 mountains, and an important part of Hokusetsu Natural Park.

Outline 
Mount Taka is one of the major mountains of Hokusetsu Mountains. Hokusetsu Mountains are themselves sometimes regarded as a part of Tanba Highland. Mount Taka is a typical mountain in this area like Mount Kenpi, Mount Yokoo and Mount Hankokou.

Religion 

Mount Taka which has a pyramidal shape has been an object of worship by the people around the mountain. The most religious spot in the middle of this mountain is Inagawa Fudoson Temple.

Route 

There are three routes to the top of the mountain. One is the most popular from Sugio Bus Stop via Inagawa Fudoson. It takes about two hours. From Morigami Bus Stop, there are two routes. It take roughly two and half hours from Morigami to the top.

Access 
 Sugio Bus Stop of Hankyu Bus
 Morigami Bus Stop of Hankyu Bus

Gallery

References
 Hokusetsu, Kyoto Nishiyama, Shobunsha, 2007
 Official Home Page of the Geographical Survey Institute in Japan

Mountains of Hyōgo Prefecture
Mountains of Osaka Prefecture